Aerangis ugandensis is a species of epiphytic orchid native to Uganda, Kenya, Rwanda, Burundi, and Congo-Kinshasa (Zaire, Democratic Republic of the Congo).

References

ugandensis
Flora of Uganda
Flora of Kenya
Flora of Rwanda
Flora of Burundi
Epiphytic orchids
Plants described in 1931